The RCA Studio II is a home video game console made by RCA that debuted in January 1977. The graphics of Studio II games were black and white and resembled those of earlier Pong consoles and their clones. The Studio II also did not have joysticks or similar game controllers but instead used two ten-button keypads that were built into the console itself. The console was capable of making simple beep sounds with slight variations in tone and length. The Studio II included five built-in games.

The Studio II was not a successful product; the previously released Fairchild Channel F made it obsolete at launch and the Atari 2600, superior to both, was released ten months later. After poor Christmas sales in 1977, RCA discontinued the Studio II.

Development
RCA engineer Joseph Weisbecker began building his own personal computer at home in the late 1960s, and encouraged the company to sell small computers. RCA introduced the Studio II video game console—using Weisbecker's COSMAC 1802 CPU—in January 1977.

Joyce Weisbecker, the daughter of the console's designer, learned how to program her father's homemade home computer as a child. After graduating from high school in 1976, she used her familiarity with the architecture to create School House I and Speedway/Tag for the Studio II, becoming the first woman to develop a commercial video game.

Market loss
The Studio II sold poorly. An internal sales document put RCA's own sales estimate for the console between 53,000 and 64,000 units sold between February 15, 1977, and January 31, 1978. It was released after the superior Fairchild Channel F, and the very successful Atari 2600 also appeared in 1977. RCA announced the console's discontinuation in February 1978 because of low Christmas sales. While losses were not disclosed, the company laid off 120 workers at its plant that produced the system in North Carolina. Some analysts blamed the fact the RCA Studio II's games were in black and white, and could not compete with systems offering color.

Technical specifications

 RCA 1802 microprocessor, 1.78 MHz
 2 KB ROM (includes the five built-in games)
 512 bytes RAM
 RCA CDP1861 "Pixie" video chip, 64x32, monochrome graphics

List of games

Built-in games
 Addition
 Bowling
 Doodle
 Freeway
 Patterns

Released cartridges
 18V400|TV Arcade I: Space War
 18V401|TV Arcade II: Fun with Numbers
 18V402|TV Arcade III: Tennis/Squash
 18V403|TV Arcade IV: Baseball
 18V404|TV Arcade Series: Speedway/Tag
 18V405|TV Arcade Series: Gunfighter/Moonship Battle
 18V500|TV School House I
 18V501|TV School House II: Math Fun
 18V600|TV Casino I: Blackjack
 18V601|TV Casino Series: TV Bingo (very limited release; only 3 copies are known to exist as of 1/7/2018)
 18V700|TV Mystic Series: Biorhythm

Cartridges released on the MPT-02 clones (France/Australia)
 MG-200 Grand Pack (Doodle, Patterns, Blackjack and Bowling)
 MG-201 Bingo
 MG-202 Concentration Match
 MG-203 Star Wars
 MG-204 Math Fun (School House II)
 MG-205 Pinball
 MG-206 Biorythm
 MG-207 Tennis/Squash
 MG-208 Fun with Numbers
 MG-209 Computer Quiz (School House I)
 MG-210 Baseball
 MG-211 Speedway/Tag
 MG-212 Spacewar Intercept
 MG-213 Gun Fight/Moon ship

Cartridges released on the Visicom COM-100 clone (Japan)

 CAS-110 Arithmetic drill (Math Fun & Fun with Numbers)
 CAS-130 Sports fan (Baseball & Sumo Wrestling)
 CAS-140 Gambler I (Blackjack)
 CAS-141 Gambler II (Slot Machine and Dice)
 CAS-160 Space Command (Space War)
 CAS-190 Inspiration (Bagua, Blood typing and Astrology)

Other
 M1200-05 Star Wars (Sheen M1200)
 M1200-07 Pinball (Sheen M1200) or Flipper (German Clone)

Legacy 
The Studio II was followed by the Studio III which can also display color and uses the RCA CDP-1802 microprocessor. A Studio IV was planned but not created.

References

External links
History of Home Video Games - RCA Studio II
The Dot Eaters article, featuring the RCA Studio II
Emma 02 including RCA Studio II Emulator
Studio II Owner's Manual

Home video game consoles
Second-generation video game consoles
RCA brands
Monochrome video game consoles
Products introduced in 1977